is a 1965 yakuza action movie directed by Seijun Suzuki. The film stars Hideki Takahashi as "Silver Fox" Tetsu. The story follows the flight of yakuza hitman Tetsu and his younger, artistic brother Kenji after the latter kills a yakuza boss in a double cross. The pair is pursued by the yakuza and police as they head for Manchuria. They are swindled of their money before they can reach their destination and take labor jobs on a tunnel project, each falling in love with their new boss's sister-in-law and wife, respectively.

Cast
 Hideki Takahashi as Tetsutaro Murakanmi
 Masako Izumi as Midori Kinoshita
 Kayo Matsuo
 Kaku Takashina
 Akira Yamauchi

References

External links
 
 
 Tattooed Life  at the Japanese Movie Database

1965 films
1965 crime drama films
Films directed by Seijun Suzuki
1960s Japanese-language films
Nikkatsu films
Yakuza films
Films produced by Masayuki Takagi
1960s Japanese films